Calw is an electoral constituency (German: Wahlkreis) represented in the Bundestag. It elects one member via first-past-the-post voting. Under the current constituency numbering system, it is designated as constituency 280. It is located in western Baden-Württemberg, comprising the districts of Calw and Freudenstadt.

Calw was created for the inaugural 1949 federal election. Since 2021, it has been represented by Klaus Mack of the Christian Democratic Union (CDU).

Geography
Calw is located in western Baden-Württemberg. As of the 2021 federal election, it comprises the districts of Calw and Freudenstadt.

History
Calw was created in 1949. In the 1949 election, it was Württemberg-Hohenzollern constituency 2 in the numbering system. In the 1953 through 1961 elections, it was number 191. In the 1965 through 1976 elections, it was number 195. In the 1980 through 1998 elections, it was number 184. In the 2002 and 2005 elections, it was number 281. Since the 2009 election, it has been number 280.

Originally, the constituency comprised the districts of Calw, Freudenstadt, and Horb. It acquired its current borders in the 1980 election.

Members
The constituency has been held continuously by Christian Democratic Union (CDU) since its creation. It was first represented by Fritz Schuler from 1949 to 1957, followed by Arved Deringer from 1957 to 1965. Helmut Prassler was representative from 1965 to 1976, followed by Haimo George from 1976 to 1987. Hans-Joachim Fuchtel was representative from 1987 to 2021, a total of nine consecutive terms. He was succeeded by Klaus Mack in 2021.

Election results

2021 election

2017 election

2013 election

2009 election

References

Federal electoral districts in Baden-Württemberg
1949 establishments in West Germany
Constituencies established in 1949
Calw (district)
Freudenstadt (district)